Jorien is a masculine and feminine Dutch given name. Notable people with the name include:
Jorien ter Mors (born 1989), Dutch speed skater
Jorien van den Herik (born 1943), Dutch businessman
Jorien Voorhuis (born 1984), Dutch speed skater
Jorien Wuite (born 1964), Sint Maarten politician

Dutch feminine given names
Dutch masculine given names